Ham-Sud is a municipality in Quebec, Canada.

Prior to October 22, 2011 it was a parish municipality and its name was Saint-Joseph-de-Ham-Sud. Quebec Route 257 passes through the region.

Toponymy
Colonized in the middle of the 19th century, the township of Ham-Sud, established in 1851, takes its name from a village in the county of Essex in England. One of its first inhabitants, Joseph Dion, would eventually see his first name honoured through attribution to the mission in 1869. The parish was established both canonically and civilly in 1877. The parish municipality, installed two years later, would also take this denomination, Saint-Joseph-de-Ham-Sud.

Demography
The 2016 census counted 235 inhabitants, which is a 4.4% increase from 2011.

History
On 22 Oct. 2011, the parish municipality of Saint-Joseph-de-Ham-Sud changed its name and status to simply Municipality of Ham-Sud.

References

External links
 
 Official website

Municipalities in Quebec
Incorporated places in Estrie